Al-Ibrahim is a patronymic derived from the given name Ibrahim. Notable people with this surname include:

Abu Hashim al-Ibrahim
Al Jawhara bint Ibrahim Al Ibrahim
Ali Al-Ibrahim
Ammar Al-Ibrahim
Hassan al-Ibrahim
Ibrahim Al-Ibrahim
Riyadh Al-Ibrahim
Taibah Al-Ibrahim
Waleed al-Ibrahim (born 1962), Saudi Arabian businessman and chairman of Middle East Broadcasting Center (MBC)

See also

Patronymics